Journal of Middle East Women's Studies is a triannual peer-reviewed interdisciplinary journal which advances Middle East gender, sexuality, and women's studies. It is published by Duke University Press for the Association for Middle East Women's Studies.

The journal is co-edited by Soha Bayoumi (The Johns Hopkins University), Ellen McLarney (Duke University), and Sherine Hafez (UC Riverside).

Editors emeritae include Frances S. Hasso, (Duke University), Miriam Cooke, (Duke University) and Banu Gökarıksel, (University of North Carolina at Chapel Hill).

Abstracting and indexing 

According to the Journal Citation Reports, the journal has a 2015 impact factor of 0.219, ranking it =35th out of 40 journals in the category "Women's Studies".

See also 
 List of women's studies journals

References 

Biannual journals
Duke University Press academic journals
English-language journals
Publications established in 2005
Women's studies journals
Triannual journals